The 1982 Belgian Grand Prix was a Formula One motor race held at Zolder on 9 May 1982. It was the fifth round of the 1982 Formula One season.

Qualifying and death of Gilles Villeneuve
Canadian driver Gilles Villeneuve was killed in an accident during the final qualifying session. At the time of the crash, his teammate Didier Pironi had set a time 0.1s faster than Villeneuve for sixth place. Contemporary and more recent writers say that he was attempting to improve his time on his final lap. Some suggest that he was specifically aiming to beat Pironi due to bitterness at being passed by him two weeks earlier in the closing stages of the San Marino Grand Prix, when Villeneuve believed Pironi had been ordered to remain behind him. Villeneuve's biographer Gerald Donaldson quotes Ferrari race engineer Mauro Forghieri as saying that the Canadian, although pressing on in his usual fashion, was returning to the pits on his last set of qualifying tyres when the accident occurred. If so, he would not have set a time on that lap.

With eight minutes of the session left, Villeneuve came over the rise after the first chicane and found Jochen Mass in the March travelling much more slowly through Butte, the left-handed bend before the Terlamenbocht corner. Mass saw Villeneuve approaching at high speed and moved to the right to let him through on the racing line. At the same instant Villeneuve also moved right to pass Mass. The Ferrari hit the back of the March and was launched into the air at a speed estimated at 200–225 km/h (120–140 mph). It was airborne for over 100 metres before nosediving into the ground and disintegrating as it somersaulted along the edge of the track. Villeneuve, still strapped to his seat but without his helmet, was thrown a further 50 metres from the wreckage into the catch fencing on the outside edge of Terlamenbocht.

Several drivers stopped and rushed to the scene. John Watson and Derek Warwick pulled Villeneuve, his face blue, from the catch fencing. The first doctor arrived on the scene within 35 seconds to find that Villeneuve was not breathing, although his pulse continued throughout; he was intubated and ventilated before being transferred to the circuit medical centre and then by helicopter to University St Raphael Hospital where a fatal fracture of the neck was diagnosed. Villeneuve was kept alive on life support while his wife travelled to the hospital and the doctors consulted with specialists worldwide. He died at 9:12 that evening.

The Ferrari team withdrew from the race after the accident and left the circuit. The final eight minutes of the qualifying were run after the crash debris had been removed. No drivers improved their times, leaving the Renaults of Alain Prost and René Arnoux on the front row of the grid.

Abbreviated race summary
John Watson won the race after taking the lead on the penultimate lap from Keke Rosberg, who was struggling on worn tires. Niki Lauda finished third on the road but was disqualified when his car was found to be underweight in post-race scrutineering, and so the final podium place went to Eddie Cheever.

Classification

Pre-Qualifying

Qualifying

Race

Championship standings after the race 

Drivers' Championship standings

Constructors' Championship standings

References

Further reading
Books

Magazines

Belgian Grand Prix
Grand Prix
Belgian Grand Prix
Circuit Zolder
May 1982 sports events in Europe